Imogene is an unincorporated community located in Martin County in the U.S. state of Minnesota. Imogene is on Minnesota State Highway 262 approximately two miles south of Granada and I-90.

History
Imogene was platted in 1900. It was named after Imogen, from Shakespeare's play Cymbeline. A post office was established as Imogen in 1901 and remained in operation until 1913.

References

External links
 HomeTownLocator Map of Imogene, Minnesota
 Short article on living in Imogene "long ago" (page created 7/24/2009)
 Imogene: Ghost Town

Unincorporated communities in Martin County, Minnesota
Unincorporated communities in Minnesota